Stepanovka is a rural locality (a selo) and the administrative centre of Stepanovsky Selsoviet, Aurgazinsky District, Bashkortostan, Russia. The population was 381 as of 2010. There are 5 streets.

Geography 
Stepanovka is located 18 km west of Tolbazy (the district's administrative centre) by road. Dobrovolnoye is the nearest rural locality.

References 

Rural localities in Aurgazinsky District